The 33rd Golden Raspberry Awards, or Razzies, was a parodic award ceremony that honored the worst films the film industry had to offer in 2012. Nominations were revealed on January 8, 2013. Unlike the previous year, when the winners were announced on April Fools' Day, the winners were announced on February 23, one day before the Academy Awards ceremony, reverting to Razzie tradition. The nominees of worst remake/sequel were selected by the general public via Rotten Tomatoes.

Winners and nominees

Films with multiple nominations

The following films received multiple nominations:

References

Golden Raspberry Awards ceremonies
Razzie Awards
2013 in American cinema
Razzies
February 2013 events in the United States
Golden Raspberry